The 2004 WNBA draft was the eighth draft in the WNBA's history. It took place on April 17, 2004, at the NBA Entertainment Studios in Secaucus, NJ.

On January 6, 2004, a dispersal draft took place.  Players were drafted from the roster of the Cleveland Rockers, who folded after the 2003 season.

Key

Dispersal draft

College draft

Round 1

Round 2

Round 3

References

Women's National Basketball Association Draft
Draft